The bead test is a traditional part of qualitative inorganic analysis to test for the presence of certain metals. The oldest one is the borax bead test or blister test. It was introduced by Berzelius in 1812. Since then other salts were used as fluxing agents, such as sodium carbonate or sodium fluoride. The most important one after borax is microcosmic salt, which is the basis of the microcosmic salt bead test.

Borax bead 
A small loop is made in the end of a platinum wire and heated in a Bunsen burner flame until red hot. A stick made of another inert substance such as a magnesia stick (MgO) may also be used.
It is then dipped into powdered borax and held in the hottest part of the flame where it swells up as it loses its water of crystallization and then shrinks, forming a colourless, transparent glass-like bead (a mixture of sodium metaborate and boric anhydride). 

The bead is allowed to cool and then wetted and dipped into the sample to be tested such that only a tiny amount of the substance adheres to the bead. If too much substance is used, the bead will become dark and opaque. The bead and adhering substance is then heated in the lower, reducing, part of the flame, allowed to cool, and the colour observed. It is then heated in the upper, oxidizing, part of the flame, allowed to cool, and the colour observed again.

Characteristic coloured beads are produced with salts of copper, iron, chromium, manganese, cobalt and nickel. After the test, the bead is removed by heating it to fusion point, and plunging it into a vessel of water.

See Also
Flame test

References

Chemical tests

ru:Перл (химия)